The Felyne, also known as the Palico (since Monster Hunter Generations), is a fictional species in the Monster Hunter video game series developed by Capcom. They accompany player characters, or "hunters", and can act as AI-controlled backup. Felynes have become a popular mascot for the series, and have featured in spin-off games, many cross-promotions with other Capcom and non-Capcom video games, and various Japanese consumer products.

Characteristics 
Felynes are members of the Lynian species of beastmen, which also includes other, similar races like the lynx-like Grimalkynes. Small in stature compared to humans, they have an appearance similar to the domestic cat, but are fully sentient, bipedal, and can speak the human language. Felynes who partner with a hunter wear miniature suits of armor. Felynes assist the player in cooking meals, maintaining gardens, and returning them to camp if they are defeated in battle. 

Several types of designs have been used to represent the Felynes in different media. In addition to the classic, realistic design used in main series games, there is a chibi design used in the spin-off games with an oversized head and large, circular eyes. Designs more resembling cartoons are used in Monster Hunter Stories for the unique Felyne Navirou and his comrades, The Numbers.

Appearances

Video games
Felynes have appeared in every game in the Monster Hunter series. Spin-off games featuring Felynes include Monster Hunter Diary: Poka Poka Airou Village, developed by FromSoftware for the Nintendo 3DS, which was also bundled with a purple PSP system, and a PSP version of Super Puzzle Fighter II Turbo called Felyne de Puzzle. A mobile game called Poka Poka Felyne Reversi was also developed.

Crossovers often involve Felyne outfits based on other video games. For Monster Hunter: World, this included a Horizon Zero Dawn skin.

Other media 
Felynes featured in the Monster Hunter live-action film, with director Paul W.S. Anderson stating that "you couldn't make a Monster Hunter movie without having a Palico in it" in response to fan concerns that Felynes would be excluded, also saying that "definitely we lean in to the Palico". An unusually large Felyne cook called the Meowscular Chef received notoriety for his appearances both in Monster Hunter: World, and the live-action movie, where he is a sidekick to the Admiral and has a "flirtatious relationship" with Captain Artemis, played by Milla Jovovich. The Meowscular Chef has been adapted for use as a custom skin in a fan-made mod for Monster Hunter World.

Products 
In 2013, several Monster Hunter 4 figures were given away as prizes in Japan, including ones based on Felynes. In 2014, a Mega Man crossover toy was released, a set of Felyne-themed 3DS XL accessories, as well as a 24 karat gold Felyne statue that cost almost $30,000 to celebrate the series' 10-year anniversary. In 2017, a highly detailed doll of a Felyne was released by Capcom for 162,000 yen. More unusual products include Felyne toilet paper-holders.

Reception 
A Felyne-themed car was used to promote the series at the Odaiba Motor Festival.

The Palicoes in Monster Hunter: World received a great deal of social media publicity when their vocalizations attracted the real-life cats of players.

References 

Video game species and races
Monster Hunter
Anthropomorphic cats
Video game mascots
Video game characters introduced in 2004